The 2006 Women's World Amateur Boxing Championships was an international women's boxing competition hosted by India from 18 November – 23 November 2006 in New Delhi. It was the 4th championship, which started in 2001 in Scranton, Pennsylvania, US.

The World Championship was contested in thirteen weight disciplines by 180 amateur women boxers from 32 countries, and was conducted in the Talkatora Indoor Stadium.

India won four gold, one silver and three bronze medals, while Russia, last year's champion, finished second with three gold and three bronze medals, followed by North Korea with a tally of 2-0-1. Canadians, the runners-up in 2005 edition, were fourth with one gold and two bronze.

Participating nations

Results
Bronze medals are awarded to both losing semi-finalists.

Medal count table

Competitions

Preliminary rounds

Semifinals

Finals

Abbreviations
 RSCOS: Referee Stopped Contest Out Scored
 RSCI: Referee Stopped Contest Injury

External links
 NDTV
 Kerela News
 Zee News
 Women Boxing
 The Hindu

Box
B
Women's World Boxing Championships
2006 in women's boxing